São Roque (meaning Saint Roch in Portuguese) is a city in the state of São Paulo in Brazil. It is part of the Metropolitan Region of Sorocaba. The population is 92,060 (2020 est.) in an area of 306.91 km². The city is at an altitude of 771 m. São Roque is connected by two main highways: Rodovia Raposo Tavares and Rodovia Castelo Branco. It is located 60 km west from the state capital. Some of the neighboring municipalities are Cotia, Vargem Grande Paulista, Ibiúna,  Mairinque and Aluminio.

São Roque has protected greenspaces and maintains itself as a lush ecological paradise.  It has a good climate with a wonderful countryside.  The Serra do Mar mountains cover the southeast.  It has an excellent infrastructure, especially well-developed for wine production.  In the 19th century, immigrants from Italy and Portugal arrived in São Roque to work in vineyards. Tourism is also a significant part of the economy.  It holds the largest artificial ski park in Latin America, the Ski Mountain Park.

Transportation
The city is served by São Paulo Catarina Executive Airport.

Persons
Juca de Oliveira, actor

References

External links
  http://www.guiasaoroque.com.br Website about São Roque
  http://www.saoroque.sp.gov.br
  São Roque on citybrazil.com.br